Tajik, Tadjik, Tadzhik or Tajikistani may refer to:

 Someone or something related to Tajikistan
 Tajiks, an ethnic group in Tajikistan, Afghanistan and Uzbekistan
 Tajik language, the official language of Tajikistan
 Tajik (surname)
 Tajik cuisine
 Tajik music
 Tajik, Iran, a village in North Khorasan Province, Iran
 Sarikoli language, spoken by Tajiks in China and officially referred to as the Tajik language in China
 The Arabic-schooled, ethnically Persian administrative officials of the Turco-Persian society

Language and nationality disambiguation pages